McBeth (also MacBeth, MacBeath) is a Scottish surname. Notable people with the surname include:

Archibald Alexander McBeth Duncan (1926–2017), British historian
Andy McBeth (born 1943), Scottish footballer
John McBeth (born 1944), author and journalist from New Zealand
Jono McBeth (born 1973), New Zealand former professional yachtsman
Marcus McBeth (born 1980), American baseball player
Nathan McBeth (born 1998), South African rugby union player
Paul McBeth (born 1990), American professional disc golfer
W. Francis McBeth (1933–2012), American composer

See also
Macbeth, King of Scotland, Mac Bethad mac Findlaích, rí na h-Alba. His death following the Battle of Lumphanan paved the way for feudalism to replace the traditional Celtic legal and political system  of Scotland.
Misspelling of: The Tragedy of Macbeth (commonly called Macbeth) is a play by William Shakespeare about a regicide and its aftermath
Boys Own McBeth, musical comedy by Grahame Bond and Jim Burnett
Sue McBeth Cabin on U.S. Route 12 in Idaho County

English-language surnames
Scottish surnames

de:McBeth